The 1798 English cricket season was the 27th in which matches have been awarded retrospective first-class cricket status and the 12th after the foundation of the Marylebone Cricket Club. The season saw eight top-class matches played in the country.

The Laws of Cricket were revised by MCC during the year. Significant changes saw the height of the stumps raised by two inches to 24 inches and the width increased by an inch to 7 inches and the bowling side able to ask for a new ball at the start of every innings. The revision introduced the idea of a "dead ball" and fielders were also to be penalised five runs for stopping the ball with their hat - an element of the Laws which survives today in Law 28.

Matches 
A total of eight top-class matches were played during the season, including matches featuring MCC as well as Hampshire, Surrey and Middlesex sides.

First mentions
Players who made their first-class cricket debuts in 1798 included:
 James Bennett
 Benjamin Clifton
 Peregrine Maitland
 Williams

References

Further reading
 
 
 
 

1798 in English cricket
English cricket seasons in the 18th century